Suran (also Romanized as Sūrān) is a village in Shandiz Rural District, Shandiz District, Torqabeh and Shandiz County, Razavi Khorasan Province, Iran. At the 2006 census, its population was 16, in 6 families.

References 

Populated places in Torqabeh and Shandiz County